Beazer is a now-defunct British housebuilding company.

Beazer may also refer to:
Beazer Homes USA, a Fortune 500 company split off from the British company
Randolph Beazer, Barbudan politician
Beazer, Alberta, a hamlet in Canada

See also
Beezer (disambiguation)